Charles Henry Munger was a U.S. politician, who was the third Mayor of Orlando from 1878 to 1879.

References

Mayors of Orlando, Florida
1845 births
Year of death missing